Parrot astrology or Parakeet fortune-telling is a type of astrology popular among the Tamils of Tamil Nadu, Telugus in Andhra Pradesh, India and Singapore. It involves using mainly rose-ringed and Alexandrine parakeets which are trained to pick up Tarot-like fortune cards.

Fortune telling process
A parrot astrologer/fortune teller typically sits beneath a tree to call or by the side of the road where people congregate. He has a cage which contains one or two trained parrots. The tarot like cards are either spread out or stacked in front of him. They are 27 in number representing the Indian cosmic system. Each card contains the image of a Hindu deity and some cards contain images of Buddha or Virgin Mary with Infant Jesus. When a patron sits before the fortune teller, the latter opens the cage and lets the parrot out. He instructs the parrot to pick a card for the patron. The parrot walks over to the cards, picks one from the stack or the spread with its beak and gives it to the astrologer. It then walks back inside its cage. The astrologer opens the card and based on the image tells the fortune of the patron.

The practice of Parrot astrology is diminishing in Tamil Nadu due to lack of patronage. In Singapore it is a tourist attraction in Little India along the Serangoon Road. A variant is also practiced in Pakistan.

Gallery

See also
 Fortune telling
 Mani the parakeet

References

Tamil culture
Aviculture
Hindu astrology
Oracular animals